The 1991 1. divisjon season, the highest women's football (soccer) league in Norway, began on 27 April 1991 and ended on 12 October 1991.

18 games were played with 3 points given for wins and 1 for draws. Number nine and ten were relegated, while two teams from the 2. divisjon were promoted through a playoff round.

Asker won the league, losing no games.

League table

Top goalscorers
 29 goals:
  Linda Medalen, Asker
 26 goals:
  Petra Bartelmann, Asker
 19 goals:
  Hege Riise, Setskog/Høland
 14 goals:
  Heidi Eivik, Grand Bodø
 11 goals:
  Lisbeth Bakken, Sprint/Jeløy
  Agnete Carlsen, Sprint/Jeløy
  Eva Gjelten, Trondheims-Ørn
 10 goals:
  Trude Stendal, Sandviken
  Lena Haugen, Setskog/Høland
  Katrin Skarsbø, Sprint/Jeløy
 9 goals:
  Birthe Hegstad, Klepp
  Turid Storhaug, Klepp
  Merete Ødegaard, Setskog/Høland

Promotion and relegation
 BUL and Skedsmo were relegated to the 2. divisjon.
 Jardar and Spjelkavik were promoted from the 2. divisjon through playoff.

References

League table
Fixtures
Goalscorers

Norwegian First Division (women) seasons
Top level Norwegian women's football league seasons
1
Nor
Nor